Osman (also Romanized as ‘Os̄mān; also known as Īmān ‘Os̄mān) is a village in Qaleh Shahin Rural District, in the Central District of Sarpol-e Zahab County, Kermanshah Province, Iran. At the 2006 census, its population was 218, in 50 families.

References 

Populated places in Sarpol-e Zahab County